Stockdale is a surname originating from Northern England, probably Yorkshire. At the time of the British Census of 1881, its frequency was highest in Yorkshire, followed by Westmorland, Cumberland, County Durham, Nottinghamshire, Cambridgeshire, Lincolnshire, Rutland, and Lancashire.

The family name has several different spellings that have appeared historically. Some of those variations are Stocksdale, Stogdel, Stogsdill, Stockdel, Stogdill, Stoxdale, and Stockstill.

People
Alan Stockdale (born 1945), Australian politician
Alexander Stockdale (1509–1563), English politician and Yorkshire landowner
Andrew Stockdale (born 1976), lead singer of Australian band Wolfmother
Sir Arthur Stockdale Cope (1857–1940), English painter
Carl Stockdale (1874–1953), American actor
Christopher Walters Stockdale (1665–1713), English parliamentarian and landowner 
Christopher Stockdale (born 1965), English cricketer
David Stockdale (born 1985), English footballer
Sir Edmund Stockdale (1903–1989), Lord Mayor of London from 1959–1960, 1st Stockdale baronet
Fletcher Stockdale (c. 1823–1890), American politician and Governor of Texas
Sir Frank Arthur Stockdale (1883–1949), English agriculturist
Freddie Stockdale (1947–2018), British opera impresario, founder of Pavilion Opera
Frederick Wilton Litchfield Stockdale (1786–1858), British artist
Geoff Stockdale (born 1944), British speed skater
Grant Stockdale (1915–1963), United States Ambassador to Ireland
Greg Stockdale (1899–1949), Australian rules footballer
Henrietta Stockdale (1847–1911), British nursing pioneer
Herbert F. Stockdale FRSE (1865–1951), British academic administrator
Jacob Stockdale (born 1996), Irish rugby player
James Stockdale (1923–2005), United States Navy admiral, 1992 U.S. Vice-Presidential candidate
John Stockdale Hardy (1793–1849) English antiquarian 
John Stockdale (1750–1814), English publisher
John Joseph Stockdale (1770–1847), publisher, son of John Stockdale
Mary Stockdale (1774–1854), writer and publisher, daughter of John Stockdale
Joseph Stockdale (1754–1803), first editor and printer of The Bermuda Gazette (est. 1784); commemorated on a Bermuda stamp in 1984
Mark Stockdale (born 1968) Australian rules footballer
Sir Noel Stockdale (1920–2004), English businessman, co-founded Asda
Percival Stockdale (1736–1811), anti-slavery English poet
Reginald Booth Stockdale (1908–1979), English Colonel Commandant of the Royal Electrical and Mechanical Engineers
Robbie Stockdale (born 1979), English footballer 
Stuart Stockdale, English fashion designer, former head of design at Pringle of Scotland
Sue Stockdale (born 1966), British polar adventurer
Susan Stockdale, England international and world champion bridge player
Sybil Stockdale (1924–2015), co-founder and National Coordinator of the National League of Families
Tim Stockdale (1964–2018), English equestrian
Thomas Stockdale (disambiguation) multiple people
Sir Thomas Minshull Stockdale (1940–2021), English barrister, 2nd Stockdale baronet
Valentine Stockdale (born 1981), English film producer
William Stockdale (1634–1693), English parliamentarian and landowner 
William Stockdale (Vice-Chancellor), Vice-Chancellor of Cambridge University, 1494

Titles
Stockdale baronets, a title in the Baronetage of the United Kingdom

Fictional people
Barney Stockdale, a character in a Sherlock Holmes short story
No Time for Sergeants, various concerning Private Will Stockdale
No Time for Sergeants, a 1954 best-selling novel by Mac Hyman
No Time for Sergeants, a 1958 film starring Andy Griffith

Places

United States 
 Stockdale, Delaware
 Stockdale, Indiana
 Stockdale, Missouri
 Stockdale, Ohio
 Stockdale, Pennsylvania
 Stockdale, Texas
 Stockdale High School (disambiguation), multiple schools
 Stockdale Mill, on the National Register of Historic Places
 Stockdale neighborhood, a neighborhood in South Bakersfield, California

United Kingdom 
 Stockdale Shales, a Silurian period geological formation in England
 Stockdale Group, another name for the above
 Stockdalewath, Cumbria

Other
USS Stockdale, several ships
Stockdale v Hansard, an 1839 decision of the United Kingdom court regarding the common law of parliamentary privilege
Vice Admiral James Bond Stockdale Award for Inspirational Leadership, U.S. naval award for inspirational leadership
Stockdale paradox, named after U.S. Navy vice-admiral James Stockdale

See also
Stocksdale, a surname

References